Spasmofen is the trade name for a combination drug used to relieve symptoms of painful cramps in smooth muscle, mainly in the bile ducts, urinary tract or gastrointestinal tract. The onset of relief can be felt after approximately 20 minutes, and last 3-5 hours.

It consists of the following drugs:
methscopolamine, a muscarinic antagonist that decreases muscular spasms
codeine, an analgesic of the opioid class
morphine, also an opioid
papaverine, an opium alkaloid antispasmodic drug
noscapine

References

Antispasmodics
Combination analgesics